Libby Hill is a small neighborhood in Richmond, Virginia. Libby Hill is located on the southeastern spur of Church Hill, overlooking the James River and the Lucky Strike building.  It is known for Libby Hill Park and "The View that Named Richmond".  The Libby Hill neighborhood is entirely within the St. John's Church Historic District.

History
Homes have existed on Libby Hill since at least 1796.  Prominent early residents include Governor George W. Smith and Colonel George Mayo Carrington.  Both the Smith and Carrington houses are no longer standing.  The oldest building in Libby Hill is the Gentry-Strokes-Crew house at 2718 North 27th St.  Built in 1839 by John Gentry, this house has undergone many changes since its construction.

The neighborhood is named for Luther Libby, who built his home on the corner of Main St. and 29th St. in 1851. Luther Libby is also the namesake of the notorious Libby Prison, even though he had no influence in the operations of the prison.

Another older house in Libby Hill is the Saunders House, built the same year as the Libby House on the corner of Main St. and 29th St.  The house at 11 1/2 North 29th St. is remarkable in that Mary Wingfield Scott, renowned Richmond historian, wrote that it is "adorned with one of the most beautiful iron verandahs in Richmond".

The View That Named Richmond

Looking from Libby Hill down towards the James River is said to be "The View That Named Richmond".  William Byrd II is said to have thought that this view resembled the view of Richmond upon Thames in England.

There is a plaque on Libby Hill that states the following: 

As of 2014, there is a proposed condominium project that could threaten this view.

Other landmarks visible from the hill include the Lucky Strike building, the Armitage Manufacturing Company building, Rockett's Landing, and Manchester, Virginia.

Confederate Soldiers and Sailors Monument

Given the expansive view and the fact that the hill overlooked the site where the Confederate Navy Yard had operated, it was once planned to erect a memorial to Robert E. Lee on Libby Hill.  When it was decided that the Lee Memorial would be built on the other side of Richmond, on Monument Avenue, plans for a monument to all Confederate Soldiers and Sailors on Libby Hill were formed.

The Confederate Soldiers' & Sailors' Monument Association was formed in 1889, with future Richmond mayor David C. Richardson as its chair.  They decided that the monument was should be modeled after "Pompey's Pillar" in Alexandria, Egypt.  It depicts a bronze Confederate private standing on top of the pillar, which is composed of 13 granite blocks to symbolize each of the Confederate states.  The monument was completed at the south end of 29th St. on May 30, 1894, at a total cost of over $30,000. Future Richmond mayor Carlton McCarthy was the orator at its unveiling.

The monument was finally removed by the city on July 8, 2020 after public demand. 

An inscription on the statue read the following:

Libby Hill Park
Libby Hill Park was created in 1851 and is at the heart of Libby Hill neighborhood. It has been known by a variety of names in the past, including "the Eastern Square", Jefferson Park, Marshall Park, and Marshall Square.

It covers the slopes of the hill between E. Franklin St and Main St. and includes fountains, paths, a small park house, the plaque describing the view that named Richmond, and the Confederate Soldiers and Sailors Monument.

It also includes monuments to Sergeant John Henry Taylor and Officer Thomas "Mongo" McMahon.  Sergeant Taylor served in the Richmond City Police Department for over 25 years, before retiring in 2009. "Sergeant John Henry Taylor's Bench" was erected by the Church Hill Crime Watch in honor of his "above and beyond care and concern for the safety of every person living on Church Hill and the surrounding areas".  Officer McMahon served in the Richmond City Police Department for over 20 years and was killed in the line of duty when, following a car chase, a suspect shot McMahon multiple times.

The steep, winding cobblestone path through the park served as one of the signature sections of the road race course used during the 2015 UCI Road World Championships.

Gallery

See also
Libby Prison
Richmond, Virginia
Armitage Manufacturing Company
Neighborhoods of Richmond, Virginia

References

Neighborhoods in Richmond, Virginia
History of Richmond, Virginia